The 2022 Delaware Fightin' Blue Hens football team represented the University of Delaware as a member of the Colonial Athletic Association (CAA) during the 2022 NCAA Division I FCS football season. They were led by first-year head coach Ryan Carty and played their home games at Delaware Stadium in Newark, Delaware.

Previous season

The Fightin' Blue Hens finished the season 5–6 overall, 3–5 CAA play to finish in 9th place. Rocco was fired at the end of the season. Former Delaware Quarterback player Ryan Carty was hired as a head coach.

Preseason

CAA poll
In the CAA preseason poll released on July 28, 2022, the Blue Hens were predicted to finish in second place out of 13 teams following the departure of James Madison and the addition on Monmouth and Hampton for the 2022 season.

Schedule

Game summaries

at Navy

Delaware State

at No. 17 Rhode Island

Hampton

Towson

at No. 16 William & Mary

Morgan State

at Elon

Monmouth

No. 12 Richmond

at Villanova

FCS Playoffs

Saint Francis – First Round

South Dakota State – Second Round

References

Delaware
Delaware Fightin' Blue Hens football seasons
Delaware Fightin' Blue Hens football
Delaware